Abhijaan is a 2022 Indian Bengali biographical film directed by Parambrata Chatterjee. The film is based on the life and works of legendary actor and Bengali icon Soumitra Chatterjee. The central character of Soumitra Chatterjee is played by Jisshu Sengupta along with a supporting cast of Prosenjit Chatterjee, Basabdatta Chatterjee, Q, Paoli Dam, Debshankar Haldar, Sohini Sengupta, Rudranil Ghosh, Tridha Choudhury and Parambrata Chatterjee.

Plot 

Dr. Sanjay Sen, a practising oncologist, arrives in Kolkata to fulfil his long-standing dream of archiving the life of legendary actor Soumitra Chatterjee, with the aim of making a film on him. At first, he turns him down but eventually agrees.

Cast 

 Jisshu Sengupta as young Soumitra Chatterjee
 Soumitra Chatterjee as himself 
 Parambrata Chatterjee as Dr. Sanjay Sen 
 Basabdatta Chatterjee as young Deepa Chatterjee
 Sohini Sengupta as Poulami Chatterjee 
 Q as Satyajit Ray 
 Prosenjit Chatterjee as Uttam Kumar 
 Paoli Dam as Suchitra Sen 
 Sohini Sarkar as Madhabi Mukherjee
 Rudranil Ghosh as Rabi Ghosh 
 Debshankar Haldar as Sisir Bhaduri
 Tridha Choudhury as Sharmila Tagore 
 Tuhina Das as Waheeda Rehman
 Samadarshi Dutta as Sunil Gangopadhyay 
 Anindita Bose as Aparna Sen
 Payel Sarkar as Tanuja
 Dulal Lahiri as Chhabi Biswas
 Padmanabha Dasgupta as Anup Kumar
 Abhijit Guha as Santosh Dutta
 Sujan Mukherjee 
 Tanusree Chakraborty

Production 
The shooting started from February 2020 and halted suddenly due to COVID-19 pandemic. The shooting resumed from 14 July 2020. The shooting was wrapped up on 23 September 2020.

Release 
The film released theatrically on 14 April 2022 coinciding Poila Baisakh.

Reception 
In The Times Of India, Jaya Biswas gave a positive review stating the film "A well-crafted tribute to an artiste by an artiste".
In Film Companion, Sankhayan Ghosh wrote "The film is held together by feeling".

Soundtrack

References

External links 
 

2022 drama films
2022 films
Bengali-language Indian films